Souls of Damnation  is the fifth full-length studio album by Norwegian death metal band, Blood Red Throne.  The album was released in 2009 by Earache Records.

Track listing

  "The Light, The Hate"   – 4:19
  "Harme"  – 4:35
  "Your Cold Flesh"  – 3:35
  "Human Fraud"  – 4:17
  "Demand"  – 3:32
  "Throne of Damnation"  – 3:37
  "Prove Yourself Dead"  – 4:36
  "Not Turgenjev, But Close"  – 3:32
  "Ten Steps of Purgatory"  – 6:41
  "Manifest Of Lies"  – 4:35 (Bonus track)
  "Affiliated With The Suffering"  – 4:06 (Bonus track)

References

2009 albums
Blood Red Throne albums
Earache Records albums